Dark Horses may refer to:

Music
Dark Horses (band), a British rock band
The Dark Horses, a band that plays with Tex Perkins
Dark Horses (The Getaway Plan album) or the title song, 2015
Dark Horses (Jon English album) or the title song, 1986
Dark Horses (Tex Perkins album), 2000
"Dark Horses" (song), by Switchfoot, 2011

Other uses
 Dark Horses, a 1992 poetry collection by X. J. Kennedy

See also
 Dark Horse (disambiguation)